Valin may refer to:

Places

Canada 
 Mount Valin, the highest mountain of the Saguenay–Lac-Saint-Jean in Quebec
 Monts-Valin National Park, national park in Quebec
 Mont-Valin, Quebec, unorganized territory in Quebec
 Zec Martin-Valin, a controlled harvesting zone, in Le Fjord-du-Saguenay, Saguenay-Lac-Saint-Jean, Quebec
 Martin-Valin Lake, a body of water on the Bras des Canots in Mont-Valin, Le Fjord-du-Saguenay, Saguenay-Lac-Saint-Jean, Quebec
 Valin River (disambiguation)

France 
 Boulevard du Général-Martial-Valin, one of the Boulevards of the Marshals in Paris

Iran 
 Valin, Iran, a village in East Azerbaijan Province

Other uses 
 Valin (surname)
 Hunan Valin Steel, Chinese steel company